Tolikara Regency is one of the regencies (kabupaten) in the Indonesian province of Highland Papua. It covers an area of 14,564 km2, and had a population of 114,427 at the 2010 Census and 239,543 at the 2020 Census; the official estimate as at mid 2021 was 242,293. The administrative centre of Tolikara Regency is the town of Karubaga.

Administrative Districts
Tolikara Regency in 2010 comprised 35 districts (distrik), but the number of districts was increased (by 2018) to 46, subdivided into 545 administrative villages. The districts are tabulated below with their areas and their populations at the 2010 Census and the 2020 Census, together with the official estimates as at mid 2021. The districts have the same names as their administrative centres, except for Wakuo (centre, Wonitu), Wunin (centre, Wurineri), Bewani (centre, Bilubaga) and Kai (centre, Kaiga) Districts. The table also includes the number of villages (rural desa and urban kelurahan) in each district, and its post code.

Notes: (a) the 2010 population of the areas now forming these new districts are included in the figures for the districts from which they were subsequently cut out. Since 2010, the former districts of Dorman (which had 171 inhabitants in 2010) and Sbey (which had 111 inhabitants in 2010) have ceased to exist, while thirteen new districts have been created, which are: Aweku, Bogonuk, Lianogoma, Biuk, Anawi, Wugi, Wenam, Kai, Tagime, Danime, Yuko, Telenggeme and Gika.

History
The VI Asian-Pacific Astronomy Olympiad took place in Tolikara in November–December 2010.

The regency was the scene of a riot against Muslims during Eid prayer in 2015.

Climate
Karubaga has a cool tropical rainforest climate (Af) with heavy rainfall year-round.

References

External links
Statistics publications from Statistics Indonesia (BPS)

Regencies of Highland Papua